The Best of Rob Zombie is a greatest hits album by Rob Zombie, released in 2006 through Geffen Records. It was certified Gold by the RIAA.

Track listing

See also
Rob Zombie discography

References

Rob Zombie albums
2006 greatest hits albums
Geffen Records albums